Oscar Holthe was a Norwegian figure skater who competed in men's singles.

He won the bronze medals at the 1898 and 1900 European Figure Skating Championships.

Competitive highlights

References 

Norwegian male single skaters
World Figure Skating Championships medalists
Date of birth missing
Date of death missing
Norwegian figure skating coaches